Gérard Granclement (born 7 April 1948) is a French cross-country skier. He competed in the men's 15 kilometre event at the 1972 Winter Olympics.

References

1948 births
Living people
French male cross-country skiers
Olympic cross-country skiers of France
Cross-country skiers at the 1972 Winter Olympics
Place of birth missing (living people)